Nikos Angeloudis (born 14 May 1991) is a Greek professional footballer who plays as a forward for Irodotos. He has also played for Kozani, PAONE, Aris, Doxa Drama and Iraklis.

Clubs

Early career
Angeloudis started his football at the youth ranks of Iraklis at the age of 12. He couldn't break through the club's first team and he was subsequently loaned to Kozani and PAONE.

Aris
He won the championship as a member of the youth team of Aris in 2010–2011 season. He was also the top scorer of the team with 14 goals. On 27 August 2011, he made his debut appearance with Aris in a match against PAS Giannena.

Doxa Drama
On 5 November 2011, he was loaned to newly promoted Superleague side Doxa Drama.

Iraklis
On 23 August 2014 he signed for Greek Football League outfit Iraklis. He made his league debut for Iraklis in the season opening game against Pierikos. On 3 August 2015 his contract with Iraklis was terminated by mutual consent.

Panserraikos
In August 2015, Angeloudis signed with Panserraikos. He scored his first goal the winner against Olympiakos Volos.

Career statistics

References

External links
myplayer.gr Profile

1991 births
Living people
Footballers from Thessaloniki
Aris Thessaloniki F.C. players
Iraklis Thessaloniki F.C. players
Super League Greece players
Greek footballers
Doxa Drama F.C. players
Panelefsiniakos F.C. players
Irodotos FC players
Association football forwards